Viburnum  is a genus of about 150–175 species of flowering plants in the moschatel family Adoxaceae. Its current classification is based on molecular phylogeny. It was previously included in the honeysuckle family Caprifoliaceae.

The member species are evergreen or deciduous shrubs or (in a few cases) small trees native throughout the temperate Northern Hemisphere, with a few species extending into tropical montane regions in South America and southeast Asia. In Africa, the genus is confined to the Atlas Mountains.

Name
The generic name Viburnum originated in Latin, where it referred to V. lantana.

Description
The leaves are opposite, simple, and entire, toothed or lobed; cool temperate species are deciduous, while most of the warm temperate species are evergreen. Some species are densely hairy on the shoots and leaves, with star-shaped hairs.

The flowers are produced in corymbs 5–15 cm across, each flower white to cream or pink, small, 3–5 mm across, with five petals, strongly fragrant in some species. The gynoecium has three connate carpels with the nectary on top of the gynoecium. Some species also have a fringe of large, showy sterile flowers around the perimeter of the corymb to act as a pollinator target.

The fruit is a spherical, oval, or somewhat flattened drupe, red to purple, blue, or black, and containing a single seed; some are edible for humans, but many others are mildly poisonous. The leaves are eaten by the larvae of many Lepidoptera species.

Birds eat the berries of Viburnum obovatum (also called Walter Viburnum after Thomas Walter).

Species

Around 165 species are described. A 2014 phylogenetic study proposed the following phylogenetic scheme and sections:

V. clemensiae Kern
Lentago – Eastern North America except for V. elatum in Mexico
V. cassinoides L. – Witherod viburnum, wild raisin, Appalachian tea
V. elatum Benth
V. lentago L. – nannyberry
V. nudum L. – possumhaw
V. obovatum Walter – Small-leaf Virbunum
V. prunifolium L. – blackhaw
V. rufidulum Raf. – rusty blackhaw
Punctata
Viburnum lepidotulum Merr. & Chun
Viburnum punctatum Buch.-Ham. Ex D. Don
Euviburnum 
V. bitchiuense Makino
V. buddleifolium
V. burejaeticum Regel et Herder
V. carlesii Hemsl. Ex Forb. & Hemsl. – Korean spice viburnum
V. cotinifolium D. Don
V. lantana L. – wayfaring tree, hoarwithy
V. macrocephalum Fortune – Chinese viburnum (琼花)
V. mongolicum (Pall.)Rehder
V. rhytidophyllum Hemsl. Ex Forb. & Hemsl. – wrinkled viburnum
V. schensianum Maxim.
V. utile Hemsl. – service viburnum
V. veitchii C.H. Wright
Pseudotinus – Asia, except V. lantanoides in Eastern North America
V. furcatum Blume ex Hook.f. & Thomson – forked viburnum, scarlet leaved viburnum
V. lantanoides Michx. – hobble-bush, American wayfaring tree
V. nervosum D. Don
V. sympodiale Graebn.
Solenotinus – Asia, extending west to India and south to Indonesia
V. awabuki Hort.Berol.  Ex  K.  Koch
V. brachybotryum Hemsl.
V. chingii P.S. Hsu
V. corymbiflorum P.S. Hsu & S.C. Hsu
V. erubescens  Wall
V. farreri Stearn – Farrer's viburnum
V. foetens
V. grandiflorum Wall. Ex DC – Himalayan viburnum
V. henryi Hemsl.
V. odoratissimum Ker-Gawl. – sweet viburnum
V. oliganthum Batalin
V. sieboldii Miq. – Siebold's viburnum
V. subalpinum Hand.-Mazz.
V. suspensum Lindl. – Sandankwa viburnum
V. taitoense Hayata
Lutescentia (excluding Tomentosa)V. amplifoliumV. colebrookeanum Wall. Ex DCV. garrettiiV. junghuniiV. lateraleV. lutescens BlumeV. pyramidatumTomentosa – China, JapanV. plicatum Thunberg – Japanese snowballV. hanceanumAmplicrenotinus (excluding Crenotinus)V. amplificatum J. Kern
UrceolataV. taiwanianum HayataV. urceolatum Siebold  &  Zucc.
Tinus – Asia, except V. tinus in EuropeV. atrocyaneum C.B. ClarkeV. calvum RehderV. cinnamomifolium Rehder – cinnamon-leaved viburnumV. davidii Franchet – David viburnumV. propinquum Hemsl.V. rigidum Vent.V. tinus M.J. – LaurustinusV. triplinerveCorisuccotinus (excluding Succotinus and Coriaceae)V. acerifolium L. – maple-leaf viburnumV. kansuense BatalinV. orientale Pall.
Succotinus V. adenophorum W.W. Sm.V. annamensis FukouokaV. betulifolium BatalinV. brachyandrum NakaiV. corylifolium Hook.f. & ThomsonV. dilatatum Thunberg – linden viburnumV. erosum ThunbergV. flavescens W.W. Sm.V. foetidum (Graebn.) RehderV. formosanum HayataV. hupehense Rehder V. ichangense RehderV. integrifolium HayataV. japonicum SprengV. lobophyllumV. luzonicum RolfeV. melanocarpum Hsu in Chen et al.V. mullaha Buch.-Ham. Ex D.DonV. parvifolium HayataV. sempervirens K. KochV. setigerum M.J. Donoghue – tea viburnumV. tashiroi NakaiV. wrightii Miquel – Wright's viburnum
CoriaceaeV. coriaceum BlumeV. cylindricum Buch.-Ham. ex D. DonV. hebanthum Wight & Arn.
SambucinaV. beccarii GambleV. hispidulum J. KernV. inopinatum Craib.V. sambucinum Reinew. Ex BlumeV. vernicosum GibbsV. ternatum Rehder
Opulus – CircumborealV. edule Raf. – squashberry, mooseberry, pembina, pimbina, lowbush cranberry, moosomin (Cree language)V. koreanum – Korean viburnumV. opulus L. – Guelder-roseV. sargentii Koehne – Tianmu viburnum (天目琼花)V. trilobum Marshall – high bush viburnum
MollotinusV. australe C.V. Morton – Mexican arrowwoodV. bracteatum Rehder – bracted arrowwood, limerock arrowwoodV. ellipticum Hook. – common viburnum, oval-leaved viburnumV. molle Michx. – softleaf arrowwoodV. rafinesquianum Schult. – downy arrowwood
Dentata – Mexico, Caribbean, and Central and South AmericaV. dentatum L. – arrowwood viburnumV. recognitum Fernald – smooth arrowwood
Oreinotinus – Mexico, Caribbean, and Central and South AmericaV. acutifolium Benth.V. caudatum Greenm.V. costaricanum (Oerst.) Hemsl.V. discolor Benth.V. disjunctum C.V. MortonV. divaricatumV. jamesonii (Oerst.)Killip & A.C. Sm.V. jucundum C.V. MortonV. lautum C.V. MortonV. loeseneri Graebn.V. stellato-tomentosum (Oerst.) Hemsl.V. stenocalyx Hemsl.V. sulcatum (Oerst.) Hemsl.V. toronis Killip & A.C. Sm.V. triphyllum Benth. – chuchua, chuque
UndeterminedV. arboreumV. betulifolium BatalinV. glomeratumV. hondurenseV. maculatumV. molinaeV. mortonianumV. phlebotrichumV. subpubescensV. treleaseiV. tridentatumV. venosum (or V. dentata var venosum)

Formerly placed hereHydrangea arborescens L. (as V. alnifolium Marshall, or V. americanum Mill.)Hydrangea macrophylla (Thunb.) Ser. (as V. macrophyllum Thunb.)

Cultivation and uses

Many species of viburnum have become popular as garden or landscape plants because of their showy flowers and berries, fragrance, and  good autumn colour of some forms. Some popular species, hybrids, and cultivars include:
 The hybrid Viburnum × bodnantense (V. farreri × V. grandiflorum) is particularly popular for its strongly scented pink flowers on the leafless deciduous shoots in mid- to late winter.
 Viburnum × burkwoodii (V. carlesii × V. utile)
 Viburnum × carlcephalum (V. carlesii × V. macrocephalum)
 Viburnum carlesii has round white flowerheads, strong fragrance, dense structure, and reddish leaves in autumn.
 Viburnum davidii is an evergreen species from China with blue fruit.
 Viburnum dentatum has flat-topped flowers, bluish fruit, and reddish leaves in autumn. It is somewhat salt-tolerant. The cultivar 'Blue Muffin' is more compact than the species and has fruit that are a deeper blue than the species.
 Viburnum dilatatum has flat-topped flowers, reddish leaves in autumn, and bright red fruit that persist into winter.
Viburnum × jackii – Jack's viburnum
 Viburnum × juddii (V. bitchiuense × V. carlesii)
 Viburnum plicatum has white flowers, textured leaves, reddish-black fruit, and can grow quite large under ideal conditions.  The species can tolerate shade, but not drought.
 Viburnum ×  (V. rhytidophyllum × V. utile)
 Viburnum × rhytidophylloides (V. lantana × V. rhytidophyllum)popular evergreen shrub, drought resistant. Shiny green leafs, white flowers. 
 Viburnum rhytidophyllum is a popular evergreen species, grown mainly for its foliage effect of large, dark green leathery leaves with strongly wrinkled surface. This is the parent species of two popular hybrid cultivars known as 'Alleghany' and ''. 'Alleghany' was selected from a hybrid between V. rhytidophyllum and V. lantana 'Mohican' (in 1958, at the US National Arboretum).
 Viburnum setigerum has upright, coarse structure and orange to reddish-orange fruit.
 Viburnum sieboldii has coarse, open structure, flat-topped flowers, reddish-black fruit, and can grow as a small tree.
 Viburnum tinus is a widely grown garden and landscape shrub.

The cultivars '' and 'Eskimo', of mixed or uncertain parentage, have won the Royal Horticultural Society's Award of Garden Merit.

Other uses
In prehistory, the long, straight shoots of some viburnums were used for arrow-shafts, as those found with Ötzi the Iceman.

The fruit of some species (e.g. V. lentago) are edible and can be eaten either raw or for making jam, while other species (e.g. V. opulus) are mildly toxic and can cause vomiting if eaten in quantity.

The bark of some species is used in herbal medicine, as an antispasmodic and to treat asthma.

Cultural references
In Ukraine Viburnum opulus is an important element of their traditional folk cultures. In Ukraine, Viburnum opulus (kalyna) is seen as a national symbol, an emblem for both the Koliada festivities and the concept of young girl's love and tenderness. It is the key element of the Ukrainian traditional wreath.  Number of folk songs are dedicated to Kalyna as well as very popular song '"Oi u Luzi Chervona Kalina"

References

 
Dipsacales genera
Taxa named by Carl Linnaeus